In 1712, a number of Maya communities in the Soconusco region of Chiapas rose in rebellion, in what is known as the Tzeltal Rebellion or Tzendal Rebellion. It was a multiethnic revolt, with 32 towns of Tzeltal (14), Tzotzil (15), and Chol (3) indigenous peoples participating in it.  The indigenous renounced the authority of the Catholic hierarchy and established a priesthood of indigenous men. There was widespread military mobilization of indigenous men, who called themselves “soldiers of the Virgin.”

Scholars have debated the origins of the conflict, but the causes are seen as increased labor and taxation demands when indigenous populations were low, and when tribute in kind obligations were mandated to be in cash, forcing the indigenous into the Spanish economy. The rebellion took on an explicitly religious and anti-Spanish character, which "did not demand reform and justice within the regime. Instead, they challenged Spanish sovereignty, the clergy, and religious legitimation." Local populations believed that the Virgin Mary had miraculously appeared to a young, married, indigenous woman, María de la Candelaria, outside the community of Cancuc.  According to María, the Virgin Mary had asked that a chapel be built in her honor. The local priest, Father Simón García Lara doubted the miracle and had the indigenous who believed in it whipped. Since the people of Cancuc wished the cult to be recognized and had not found that approval by the local priest, they sought out the bishop and sent a delegation to Ciudad Real. The bishop imprisoned most of them, but some escaped to tell of the mistreatment.  An indigenous man, Sebastián Gómez de la Gloria, came to Cancuc from nearby Chenalhó and declared the solution to the problem of non-recognition of the Virgin’s cult by the Catholic hierarchy was to create an indigenous religious hierarchy.  The various indigenous towns raised military units, which were organized along a similar hierarchy to Spanish colonial units. They targeted the local Spanish population, wiping out Spanish troops, killing Spanish children, and carrying off the Spanish women as concubines. The Spanish women were forced to dress in indigenous attire and perform manual labor, such as grinding corn. Following the defeat of the revolt in 1713, these Spanish women were brought before the Mexican Inquisition and questioned intensively.  The Spanish military forces defeated the indigenous soldiers of the Virgin. The town of “Cancuc was obliterated and its inhabitants moved to other towns.”  The Spanish authorities had been alarmed at the size and the direction the rebellion had taken, a coordinated, multiethnic revolt that defied Spanish civil and ecclesiastical authority, necessitating a major military response. “The defeat of the revolt was so thorough that it left the province devastated and in deeper poverty.” The Spanish executed nearly a hundred participants and those who escaped were relentlessly pursued over years.

See also
Mexican Indian Wars

Further reading

Bricker, Victoria Reifler. The Indian Christ, the Indian King: The Historical Substrate of Maya Myth and Ritual. Austin: University of Texas Press 1981, pp. 55-69.
Gosner, Kevin, Soldiers of the Virgin: An Ethohistorical Analysis of the Tzeltal Revolt of 1712 Tucson: University of Arizona Press 1992.
Viquiera, Juan Pedro. Indios rebeldes e idólatras: Dos ensayos históricos sobre la rebelión india de Cancuc, Chiapas, acaecida en el año de 1712. Mexico City 1997.
Wasserstrom, Robert. “Ethnic Violence and Indigenous Protest: The Tzeltal (Maya) Rebellion of 1712”. Journal of Latin American Studies 12 (1980): 1-19.

References

1712 in New Spain
Conflicts in 1712
18th-century rebellions
History of religion in Mexico
Indigenous rebellions against the Spanish Empire
Mesoamerican warfare
Rebellions against the Spanish Empire
Rebellions in Mexico
Wars involving the indigenous peoples of North America
Maya history
History of Chiapas